As One is the fourteenth studio album by the funk band Kool & the Gang, released in 1982. The album did not yield any #1 singles, but the song "Let's Go Dancin'" did make the top ten, peaking at #7 on the U.S. R&B chart and #6 on the UK Singles Chart.  "Big Fun" also became an international hit.

Track listing

Personnel
Bass guitar, backing vocals – Robert "Kool" Bell
Drums, backing vocals – George Brown
Guitar – Charles Smith
Tenor saxophone, OB-X synthesizer, backing vocals – Ronald Bell
Keyboards, alto saxophone – Curtis Williams
Lead and backing vocals – James "J.T." Taylor
Percussion – Jimmy Maelen
Keyboards – Eumir Deodato
Alto saxophone – Steve Greenfield
Trombone, backing vocals – Clifford Adams
Trumpet, backing vocals – Michael Ray, Robert Mickens
Handclaps – Dennis Thomas
Strings – Kermit Moore

Production
Engineer – Cliff Hodsdon, Jim Bonnefond
Assistant engineers – Barbara Ivone, Nelson Ayres
Mixed by – Jim Bonnefond, Gabe Vigorito, Eumir Deodato
Mastered by – Jose Rodriguez, Gabe Vigorito
Producer – Eumir Deodato
Co-producer – Kool & The Gang

Art
Design – Mo Ström
Art direction – Bill Levy, Bob Heimall
Cover concept and artwork by – Quintet Associates

Certifications

References

Kool & the Gang albums
1982 albums
Mercury Records albums
Albums produced by Eumir Deodato